Robert Stephenson (1803–1859) was a railway engineer.

Robert Stephenson is also the name of:
 Len Stephenson (Robert Leonard Stephenson, 1930–2014), English footballer
 Bob Stephenson (sportsman) (born 1942), English cricketer and footballer
 Bob Stephenson (ice hockey) (born 1954), retired Canadian ice hockey right winger
 Bob Stephenson (baseball) (1928–2020), American baseball player
 Robert Stephenson (baseball) (born 1993), American baseball player
 Bob Stephenson (actor) (born 1967), American actor, film producer and screenwriter
 Robert Donston Stephenson (1841–1916), writer and journalist
 Bob Stephenson (American football) (born 1959), American football player
 Robert Stephenson (footballer) (1875–?), British footballer

See also
 Robert Stevenson (disambiguation)
 Robert Stevenson (civil engineer) (1772–1850), Scottish civil engineer
 Robert Louis Stevenson (1850–1894), Scottish author